From 2007 until 2009 the Australian Football League produced the AFL Army Award to recognise players who produced significant acts of bravery or selflessness to promote the cause of their team during a game. Examples of such bravery that are not usually rewarded include, a chase-and-tackle, executing a solid bump, shepherd or spoil despite facing potential heavy contact, a difficult assist on a goal, taking a mark whilst running back with the flight of the ball, and so forth.

Selection process
Three nominees were selected by a panel and put up for a public vote after each of the 22 regular season rounds.  Each of the weekly winners were then considered by the panel (AFL All Australian Selection Committee) to produce a selection for the general public to vote on. The winner of the vote does need the endorsement of the selection panel.  The process was similar to the system of deciding the Goal of the Year and Mark of the Year awards.

Winners

References

External links
 AFL official site for the AFL Army Award
 The Australian Army site announcing the sponsorship.
 Army Australian Government Information page about award.

Australian Football League awards
Australian rules football awards
Awards established in 2007
Awards disestablished in 2009